Crowngate Worcester is a shopping centre in Worcester, England, built in part on the historic site of the Worcester Blackfriars monastery, and replacing the former Blackfriars shopping centre.

It contains forty-nine stores, with a range of both large and smaller units, including House of Fraser and Primark. There are three restaurants in the recently refurbished Friary Walk: Wildwood Kitchen, Bills restaurant and Anatolian Palace.

Other facilities include a 780 space, multi-story car park, Worcester's bus station and the Huntingdon Hall Theatre.

In October 2009 the centre underwent a £5 million refurbishment.
In 2017, plans for a new look for Crowngate were published., which were completed in 2019, and gave the existing building a brand new frontage.

Construction and excavations
Archaeological excavations were carried out in 1985–6, prior to the construction of the new centre. They uncovered:
 a Roman road and timber buildings
 a Saxon building and bread ovens
 the cloisters and friary church of the monastery, which were aligned with the Roman Road 
 civil war defences facing towards St Johns.

Nevertheless, the nine months of funding to excavate the site "proved insufficient to complete the work and analyse the finds". The small finds were repackaged by volunteers in 2010.

There are plaques dotted around Crowngate, to be found, which tell the history of the site.

Stores
Stores present include House of Fraser, Primark, Boots, The Body Shop, Claire's, Smiggle, Ryman, Warren James, Rise, New Look, Superdrug, Iceland, and Cornucopia.

Bus Station
The bus station is located below the shopping centre and the main bus operator is First Midland Red.

Routes serving the bus station

References

External links
 

Shopping centres in Worcestershire
Shopping malls established in 1992
Buildings and structures in Worcester, England